Şirin is a Turkish form of the Persian name Sherine. Notable people with the name include:

Given name
Şirin Hatun (before 1450 – after 1500), second wife of Ottoman Sultan Bayezid II
 Şirin Pancaroğlu (born 1968), Turkish harpist

Surname
 Arif Şirin (born 1949), Turkish composer
 Gökhan Şirin (born 1990, Turkish basketball player
 Osman Şirin (born 1943), Turkish judge

Turkish-language surnames
Turkish feminine given names